Spirobranchus is a small genus of tube-building annelid fanworms in the family Serpulidae.

Species
The species in the genus (World Register of Marine Species) include:

 Spirobranchus giganteus Pallas, 1766. Christmas-tree worm
 Spirobranchus corniculatus (Grube, 1862)
 Spirobranchus latiscapus Marenzeller, 1885
 Spirobranchus aloni Perry, Bronstein, Simon-Blecher, Atkins, Kupriyanova, ten Hove, Levy & Fine, 2018				
 Spirobranchus americanus (Day, 1973)													
 Spirobranchus arabicus Monro, 1937													
 Spirobranchus baileybrockae Pillai. 2009													
 Spirobranchus cariniferus (Gray, 1843)
 Spirobranchus coronatus Straughan, 1967													
 Spirobranchus corrugatus Straughan, 1967													
 Spirobranchus decoratus Imajima, 1982													
 Spirobranchus dendropoma Mörch, 1863													
 Spirobranchus eitzeni Augener, 1918													
 Spirobranchus gardineri Pixell, 1913													
 Spirobranchus giganteus (Pallas, 1766)													
 Spirobranchus incrassatus KrøyerinMörch, 1863											
 Spirobranchus kraussii (Baird, 1865)													
 Spirobranchus lamarcki (Quatrefages, 1866)													
 Spirobranchus latiscapus (Marenzeller, 1885)													
 Spirobranchus lima (Grube,	1862)													
 Spirobranchus maldivensis Pixell, 1913													
 Spirobranchus minutus (Rioja, 1941)													
 Spirobranchus murrayi Pillai, 2009													
 Spirobranchus nigranucha (Fischli, 1903)													
 Spirobranchus paumotanus (Chamberlin, 1919)													
 Spirobranchus polycerus (Schmarda, 1861)													
 Spirobranchus polytrema (Philippi, 1844)													
 Spirobranchus pseudopolytremus Pillai, 2009													
 Spirobranchus richardsmithi Pillai, 2009													
 Spirobranchus spinosus Moore, 1923													
 Spirobranchus taeniatus (Lamarck, 1818)													
 Spirobranchus tenhovei Pillai, 2009													
 Spirobranchus tetraceros (Schmarda, 1861)													
 Spirobranchus triqueter (Linnaeus, 1758)													
 Spirobranchus zelandicus Pillai, 2009													
 Spirobranchus zibrowii Pillai, 2009

References

Bibliography
 

Serpulidae
Polychaete genera